Hopkins Hollow Village is an historic district along Hopkins Hollow Road, Narrow Lane, and Perry Hill Road in Coventry, Rhode Island, United States, and West Greenwich, Rhode Island.

The village features American colonial and Federal era architecture. The Hopkins Hollow Church, built circa 1850 in a Greek Revival style, is located within the village adjacent to the Hopkins Hollow cemetery. The village was added to the National Register of Historic Places in 2010.

See also
National Register of Historic Places listings in Kent County, Rhode Island

References

Colonial architecture in Rhode Island
Federal architecture in Rhode Island
Villages in Kent County, Rhode Island
Providence metropolitan area
Villages in Rhode Island
Coventry, Rhode Island
Historic districts on the National Register of Historic Places in Rhode Island
National Register of Historic Places in Kent County, Rhode Island